Cuidado con las colas is a 1964 Argentine film directed by Julio Saraceni and starring Juan Carlos Thorry and Ambar La Fox.

Cast
  Juan Carlos Thorry
  Ambar La Fox 
  Beba Bidart
  Enrique Serrano
  Julia Sandoval
  Fernando Siro
  Beatriz Taibo
  Vicente Rubino
  Paulette Christian
  Lalo Hartich
  Joe Rígoli
  María Armand
  Zulema Esperanza
  Zulma Grey
  Ricardo Quinteros
  Lucio Deval
  Ricardo Jordán
  Osvaldo Castro

References

External links
 

1964 films
1960s Spanish-language films
Argentine black-and-white films
Films directed by Julio Saraceni
1960s Argentine films